Philippe d'Encausse (born 24 March 1967 in Clermont-Ferrand) is a retired French pole vaulter, whose father, Hervé d'Encausse, was a European record holder and 1968 Olympic finalist in pole vault. He is currently Renaud Lavillenie's coach,
as well as being Marion Fiack's coach.

Achievements

External links

1967 births
Living people
French male pole vaulters
Athletes (track and field) at the 1988 Summer Olympics
Athletes (track and field) at the 1992 Summer Olympics
Olympic athletes of France
Sportspeople from Clermont-Ferrand
Mediterranean Games gold medalists for France
Mediterranean Games medalists in athletics
Athletes (track and field) at the 1991 Mediterranean Games